Edward Selover Esty (July 17, 1824 – October 2, 1890) was an American politician from New York.

Life
Edward S. Esty was born in Ithaca, New York on July 17, 1824, the son of Joseph Esty (born 1798) and Mary (Selover) Esty. He attended the common schools and Ithaca Academy. Then he engaged in farming and tanning. On May 12, 1846, he married Amelia Wilgus, and they had three children.

He was a member of the New York State Assembly (Tompkins Co.) in 1858.

He was President of the Board of Education of Ithaca from 1874 until his death; and Vice President of the First National Bank of Ithaca from 1883 until his death.

He was a member of the New York State Senate (26th D.) in 1884 and 1885.

He died on October 2, 1890, while on a visit in Boston, and was buried in Ithaca.

Sources

 The New York Red Book compiled by Edgar L. Murlin (published by James B. Lyon, Albany NY, 1897; pg. 403 and 483)
 Biographical sketches of the Members of the Legislature in The Evening Journal Almanac (1885)
 TELEGRAPHIC BREVITIES; The funeral of Edward S. Esty, who died in Boston last week... in NYT on October 7, 1890
 Esty genealogy at RootsWeb
 Edward S. Esty at Tompkins County Gen Web

1824 births
1890 deaths
Republican Party New York (state) state senators
Politicians from Ithaca, New York
Republican Party members of the New York State Assembly
19th-century American politicians